Allen Boozer (Born July 28, 1944 in Orangeburg, South Carolina) is an American physicist, full professor, Department of Applied Physics and Applied Mathematics, Columbia University and co-recipient of the 2010 Hannes Alfvén Prize. He is noted for work in plasma physics.

Education
Ph.D., physics, Cornell University, 1970.
bachelor-of-arts degree in physics from the University of Virginia in 1966
Elected to Phi Beta Kappa as an undergraduate and received Woodrow Wilson and National Science Foundation fellowships as a graduate student.

References

External links 
Homepage

21st-century American physicists
Living people
University of Virginia alumni
Cornell University alumni
Columbia School of Engineering and Applied Science faculty
Place of birth missing (living people)
1944 births